The Chief Justice of the Uttarakhand High Court is the highest presiding judicial officer in the state of Uttarakhand and the custodian of the Uttarakhand High Court. He is appointed by the President of India with the advice of Chief Justice of India and the Governor of Uttarakhand. Vipin Sanghi is the current Chief Justice of the Uttarakhand High Court. He assumed office on 28 June 2022.

List of the Chief Justices of Uttarakhand

Following is the list of the Chief Justices of Uttarakhand since its inception on 9 November 2000:

Colour key

See also
Uttarakhand High Court
List of judges of the Uttarakhand High Court
List of current Indian chief justices
List of sitting judges of the high courts of India
List of chief justices of India
List of sitting judges of the Supreme Court of India
Bar Council of Uttarakhand
Uttarakhand Lokayukta
Government of Uttarakhand
Governor of Uttarakhand
Chief Minister of Uttarakhand
Cabinet of Uttarakhand
Speaker of the Uttarakhand Legislative Assembly
Leader of the Opposition in the Uttarakhand Legislative Assembly

References

External links
 The High Court of Uttarakhand (Official Website)

 
U
Uttarakhand-related lists